Erythrina schimpffii is a species of legume in the family Fabaceae. It is found only in Ecuador. Its natural habitat is both the subtropical and tropical moist montane forests.

References

schimpffii
Flora of Ecuador
Near threatened plants
Taxonomy articles created by Polbot